Tsvetan Genev (13 November 1898 – 4 March 1945) was a Bulgarian footballer. He played in three matches for the Bulgaria national football team from 1924 to 1927. He was also part of Bulgaria's squad for the football tournament at the 1924 Summer Olympics, but he did not play in any matches. Genev coached Levski Sofia during their first ever championship title win in 1933. His father was the Bulgarian general Nikola Genev.

Honours
Player

Levski Sofia

 Sofia Championship – 1923, 1924, 1925
 Ulpia Serdika Cup – 1926
Coach

Levski Sofia

 Bulgarian A PFG – 1933
 Sofia Championship – 1933

References

External links
 

1898 births
1945 deaths
Bulgarian footballers
Bulgaria international footballers
Place of birth missing
Association football forwards
PFC Levski Sofia players
Bulgarian football managers
PFC Levski Sofia managers